Marcello Mularoni (born 8 September 1998) is a Sanmarinese football player who plays as a midfielder for Tropical Coriano.

Career
Mularoni debuted with the senior national team on 11 October 2018 in a 2018–19 UEFA Nations League match against Moldova.

External links

1998 births
Living people
Sammarinese footballers
San Marino international footballers
Association football midfielders
S.C. Faetano players